Sex, Sin, and Zen: A Buddhist Exploration of Sex from Celibacy to Polyamory and Everything in Between is a book written by Zen priest and punk rock bassist Brad Warner. The book is an exploration of sex from a modern Zen Buddhist perspective.  It alternates between practical chapters and more arcane, conceptual ones.

The book also features an interview with porn star Nina Hartley who was raised in Berkeley, California by two Zen Buddhists.

Reception
The book received mostly positive reviews. Publishers Weekly said of the book, "The subject is as fundamental as the human sex drive, which does not go away as one spends time on the cushion...Kudos to Warner for tackling the subject."

The book has been seen as being alternatively too positive towards polyamory and too critical of it.

Publication data

References

2010 non-fiction books
Books about Zen